Brazil competed at the 1932 Summer Olympics in Los Angeles, United States. Brazil returned to the Olympic Games after missing the 1928 Summer Olympics.

Background
As the Great Depression had struck the country, the delegation of 82 athletes travelled in a ship, the Itaquicê, selling coffee along the way to fund the trip. Since the San Pedro authorities charged one dollar for each person who disembarked in the Port of Los Angeles, the organizers only let out of the ship the athletes they felt had a chance to win medals plus swimmer Maria Lenk – the first South American woman to compete in the Olympics – to spend less. Afterwards, the Itaquicê went to San Francisco to sell more coffee, and there the water polo, rowing and athletics competitors got financed.

Athletics

18 men competed. The most notable case was Adalberto Cardoso, who hitched a ride from San Francisco to Los Angeles and only arrived at the Los Angeles Memorial Coliseum ten minutes prior to the 10,000 m race he would run. Cardoso competed barefoot and finished last, but was cheered by the audience and earned a special medal.

Rowing

18 men competed in four different boats.

Ranks given are within the heat.

Shooting

Six Brazilian shooters competed.

Swimming

7 men and one woman competed.

 Men

	
 Women

Water Polo

Brazil made its debut at water polo, but the team was disqualified after the players assaulted officials at the end of the match with Germany.

Brazil vs. Germany: 3:7
Brazil vs. United States: 1:6

Team: Mario De Lorenzo, Pedro Theberge, Salvador Amendola, Jefferson Maurity Souza, Luis Henrique Da Silva, Carlos  Castello  Branco,  Antonio Ferreira Jacobina, Adhemar Serpa

References

Official Olympic Reports
1932 Olympics Report, Brazilian Olympic Committee
Sports-reference

Nations at the 1932 Summer Olympics
1932
1932 in Brazilian sport